From 1935 to 1971 civil defence in the United Kingdom was the responsibility of the Civil Defence Department. On the run-down of civil defence in 1971 the department was replaced by the Home Defence and Emergency Services Division of the Home Office. It was later renamed the Emergency Planning Division.

The head of the division was an Assistant Secretary.

Head of Home Defence and Emergency Services Division
R M Whalley c.1988
Mrs JA Thompson c.1986
Alan Howard c.1980
MJ Moriarty 1975-1979

Emergency management in the United Kingdom